Kate Flood (born 14 August 1992) is a former captain of the Louth Gaelic football team who, and played Australian rules football for the Fremantle Football Club in the AFL Women's (AFLW).

In August 2020, Flood retired from Australian rules football.

Association football
Flood also played soccer, representing Dundalk and the Republic of Ireland women's national under-19 football team in the early part of her career. She joined Raheny United before the Women's National League (WNL) was formed in 2011 and represented the club in the competition's first season.

In 2015, she was part of the Newry City team which won the Northern Ireland Women's Premier League, with a dramatic last-minute winner over Mid-Ulster Ladies.

References

External links 

1992 births
Living people
Fremantle Football Club (AFLW) players
Irish players of Australian rules football
Ladies' Gaelic footballers who switched code
Irish expatriate sportspeople in Australia
Republic of Ireland women's youth international footballers
Republic of Ireland women's association footballers
Women's association football midfielders
Women's National League (Ireland) players
Raheny United F.C. players
Women's Premiership (Northern Ireland) players
Newry City Ladies F.C. players